The 1996 United States presidential election in Georgia took place on November 5, 1996, as part of the 1996 United States presidential election. Voters chose 13 representatives, or electors to the Electoral College, who voted for president and vice president.

Georgia was won by Senator Bob Dole (R-KS) by a narrow 1.2% margin. The Peach State was the third-closest contest that year with only Kentucky and Nevada being closer. Dole's victory was possible due to the declining support for Democrats in Georgia and many other Southeastern States, though the Democratic Party in Georgia would remain a significant institution until the early 2000s. Billionaire businessman Ross Perot (Ref-TX), who had unsuccessfully run for president as an Independent in the previous election, won 6.4% of the popular vote in the Peach state, a significant total for a third-party candidate. Until the 2020 election (which Democrats won), this was the last time that a Democratic presidential nominee finished within 2% of the Republican candidate; this was also the last time any third-party candidate has won more than 5% of the popular vote in Georgia.

During the concurrent U.S. Senate election in Georgia, Secretary of State of Georgia Max Cleland (D) narrowly defeated businessman Guy Millner (R) 48.87% to 47.54% to win election to the seat that Incumbent Senator Sam Nunn (D) left open to retire. In addition, incumbent U.S. Representatives Sanford Bishop (D-GA-2), Saxby Chambliss (R-GA-8), and Charlie Norwood (R-GA-10) all received strong challenges that year during the House elections but were nonetheless re-elected.

Georgia weighed in for this election as 10 points more Republican than the national average. , this is the last election in which Wheeler, Butts, Heard, Polk, Long, Hart, Chattooga, Elbert, Treutlen, Decatur, Screven, Wilkes, Greene, Dodge, Clinch, Crawford, Lanier, Miller, Brooks, Taylor, Turner, Wilcox, Cook, Marion, Jenkins, Atkinson, Berrien, Lamar, Crisp, Emanuel, Pulaski, Schley, Grady, Irwin, Johnson, Seminole, Putnam, Montgomery, Jasper, and Ben Hill counties voted for a Democratic presidential candidate.

Georgia was one of three states won by Clinton in 1992 that Bob Dole was able to flip, the others being Montana and Colorado.

Dole's victory was the first of six consecutive Republican victories in the state, as Georgia would not vote Democratic again until Joe Biden narrowly won the state in 2020. It has since become a swing state. This is the last election in which Georgia would vote differently from Arizona as both had Republican winning streaks from 2000 to 2016 before both flipping to Biden in 2020.

This was the first election since 1980 that Georgia backed the losing candidate and the first since 1964 that it backed the losing Republican nominee.

Results

Results by county

Electors
Technically the voters of Georgia cast their ballots for electors: representatives to the Electoral College. Georgia was allocated 13 electors because it had 11 congressional districts and 2 senators. All candidates who appeared on the ballot or qualified to receive write-in votes had to submit a list of 13 electors, who pledged to vote for their candidate and his or her running mate. Whoever won the majority of votes in the state was awarded all 13 electoral votes. Their chosen electors then vote for president and vice president. Although electors are pledged to their candidate and running mate, they are not obligated to vote for them. An elector who votes for someone other than his or her candidate is known as a faithless elector.

The electors of each state and the District of Columbia met in December 1996 to cast their votes for president and vice president. The Electoral College itself never meets as one body. Instead the electors from each state and the District of Columbia met in their respective capitols.

The following were the members of the Electoral College from the state. All were pledged to and voted for Bob Dole and Jack Kemp.

 Thomas J. Barnette
 Dot Burns
 Jeanne Ferst
 Briggs A. Goggans
 Camilla Johnson-Moore
 Brenda R. (B.J.) Lopez
 Mack Mattingly
 Russell K. (Rusty) Paul
 Oscar N. Persons
 Alec Poitevint
 John M. Stuckey, Jr.
 Stan Wise
 Ray Wooldridge

Notes

References

Georgia
1996
1996 Georgia (U.S. state) elections